Lo chiameremo Andrea (also known as We'll Call Him Andrew) is a 1972 Italian comedy film directed by Vittorio De Sica.

Plot
The story is of Nino Manfredi as Paolo Antonazzi and Mariangela Melato as Maria Antonazzi, teachers at the same school who although they love each other, are childless.

Cast
 Nino Manfredi as Paolo Antonazzi
 Mariangela Melato as Maria Antonazzi
 Anna Maria Aragona as Teacher
 Giulio Baraghini as Mariani
 Maria-Pia Casilio as Bruna Parini
 Guido Cerniglia as Arturo Soriani
 Violetta Chiarini as Teacher
 Solveyg D'Assunta as Nino's mother
 Antonino Faà Di Bruno as Schoolmaster (as Antonino Di Bruno)
 Donato Di Sepio as Carlo Alberto Spadacci
 Luigi Antonio Guerra as The janitor
 Alessandro Iacarella as Schoolboy
 Isa Miranda as Teacher
 Enzo Monteduro as Teacher

References

External links

1972 films
1972 comedy films
1970s Italian-language films
Films directed by Vittorio De Sica
Films scored by Manuel De Sica
Films about educators
Films with screenplays by Cesare Zavattini
Commedia all'italiana
1970s Italian films